Nathalie Simon (née Chevallier) (born 14 April 1962) is a former French athlete, who specialised in the 400 metres.

Biography  
Champion of France 400 meters in 1986 she was seventh in the 4 × 400 m relay at the 1987 World Championships, at Rome.  She participated in the following year in the 1988 Seoul Olympics. Eliminated in the 400m heats, she took seventh in the  4 × 400 m relay.

In 1987, she won the gold medal in the 400m at Mediterranean Games at Latakia, Syria.

prize list  
 French Championships in Athletics   :  
 winner of the 400m 1986

Records

notes and references

External links  
 Olympic profile for Nathalie Simon (athletics) at sports-reference.com

Living people
1962 births
People from Le Petit-Quevilly
French female sprinters
Olympic athletes of France
Athletes (track and field) at the 1988 Summer Olympics
Mediterranean Games gold medalists for France
Athletes (track and field) at the 1987 Mediterranean Games
Mediterranean Games medalists in athletics
Sportspeople from Seine-Maritime
Olympic female sprinters